Gheorghe Tattarescu (October 1818 – October 24, 1894) was a Moldavian, later Romanian painter and a pioneer of neoclassicism in his country's modern painting.

Biography

Early life and studies
Tattarescu was born in Focşani in 1818. He began as an apprentice to his uncle Nicolae Teodorescu, a church painter. He studied at the Painting School from Buzău, when Teodorescu moved there. The Orthodox Bishop of Buzău, Chesarie Căpățână, helped him obtain a scholarship in Rome, where he was taught by professors from the Accademia di San Luca. While there, Tattarescu made copies of paintings by Raphael, Bartolomé Estéban Murillo, Salvatore Rosa, and Guido Reni.

Political activities

Tattarescu was a participant in the 1848 Revolution in Wallachia. After the revolution, he painted portraits of Romanian revolutionaries in exile such as Gheorghe Magheru, Ştefan Golescu, and, in 1851, that of Nicolae Bălcescu (in three almost identical versions). Romantic nationalist ideals were the inspiration for his allegorical compositions with revolutionary themes in Romania's rebirth (1849), the patriotic Principalities' Unification (1857) and February 11 - The Modern Romania (1866).

Later life and legacy
In 1860, being commissioned to draw up a National Album of sights and historical monuments of the country, his talent of painting vaguely Romantic landscapes became highly valued. At the same time, showing his sympathy with various peasant uprisings, he painted The peasant at the Danube in 1875. He was also commissioned to decorate several churches in a neoclassical manner.

In 1864, together with painter Theodor Aman, Tattarescu founded the National School of Fine Arts in Bucharest. He was a professor there for a long time after, and served as the School's Director for two years (1891–1892).

In 1865, he wrote Useful Principles and Studies on Proportions of the Human Body and Drawing after the Most Famous Painters.

Tattarescu died in Bucharest. The house he bought in 1855 and lived in for almost 40 years is now home to the Gheorghe Tattarescu Memorial Museum. It was opened 1951, and hosts several of his original works of art.

Gallery
Click on an image to view it enlarged.

See also
 Metropolitan Cathedral, Iaşi

Notes

References
 Voinescu, Teodora, Gheorghe Tattarescu 1818-1894, Ed. Academiei Romane, 1940.

External links

  Biography at artnet.com
 Biography at maroumanie.com
 Biography at ici.ro
 Biography at compendium.ro

1818 births
1894 deaths
Romanian romantic painters
Romanian Neoclassical painters
People from Focșani
People of the Revolutions of 1848
Academic staff of the Bucharest National University of Arts
Romanian art critics
Romanian essayists
Romanian muralists
Members of the Romanian Orthodox Church
Burials at Bellu Cemetery
19th-century journalists
Male journalists
19th-century Romanian painters
Male essayists
19th-century male writers
19th-century essayists